Batman with Robin the Boy Wonder may refer to:

Batman with Robin the Boy Wonder (comic), a comic strip (1966–1974)
Batman with Robin the Boy Wonder, a rebranded, 30-minute version of the animated series The Adventures of Batman premiering September 13, 1969